Bahia absinthifolia, the hairyseed bahia or desert bahia, is a North American species of flowering plants in the family Asteraceae. It is native to northern Mexico (Tamaulipas, Nuevo León, Coahuila, Chihuahua, San Luis Potosí, Querétaro, Hidalgo, Durango, Aguascalientes) and the south-western United States (Arizona  New Mexico Texas; populations reported from Utah appear to be introductions).

Bahia absinthifolia  is a perennial up to 40 cm (16 inches) tall. It has yellow flowers with both ray florets and disc florets. It grows in sandy soil in desert regions.

References

absinthifolia
Flora of Mexico
Flora of the Southwestern United States
Plants described in 1839